Tammy's Always Dying is a 2019 Canadian black comedy film directed by Amy Jo Johnson and written by Joanne Sarazen. It stars Felicity Huffman, Anastasia Phillips, Jessica Greco, Clark Johnson, Lauren Holly, Aaron Ashmore and Kristian Bruun.

It had its world premiere at the 2019 Toronto International Film Festival on September 5, 2019. It received generally positive reviews from critics, particularly for Huffman's and Phillips' performances. It was released through video on demand on May 1, 2020 by Quiver Distribution.

Plot
When Tammy, a self-destructive woman who has a dysfunctional relationship with her daughter Catherine, is diagnosed with terminal cancer, Catherine invites a television producer to document her process of caring for her mother in an attempt to profit from their misfortune. However, she finds her plans complicated by Tammy's persistent refusal to actually die.

Cast
 Felicity Huffman as Tammy MacDonald
 Anastasia Phillips as Catherine MacDonald
 Clark Johnson as Doug
 Lauren Holly as Ilana Wiseman
 Aaron Ashmore as Reggie Seamus
 Kristian Bruun as Jamie
 Jessica Greco as Kelly Seamus
 Oluniké Adeliyi as Pascal
 Ali Hassan as Gordon Baker

Production
In December 2018, it was announced Felicity Huffman, Anastasia Phillips, Clark Johnson, Lauren Holly and Aaron Ashmore had joined the cast of the film, with Amy Jo Johnson directing from a screenplay by Joanne Sarazen. Principal photography concluded in December 2018 in Hamilton, Ontario.

Release
The film had its world premiere at the Toronto International Film Festival on September 5, 2019. In March 2020, Quiver Distribution acquired U.S. distribution rights to the film. It was released through video on demand on May 1, 2020.

Reception
On review aggregator website Rotten Tomatoes, the film holds an approval rating of  based on  reviews. The website's consensus reads, "It occasionally struggles to deal effectively with its weighty themes, but Tammy's Always Dying is always anchored by Felicity Huffman's finely tuned performance."

The film received two Canadian Screen Award nominations at the 9th Canadian Screen Awards in 2021, for Best Supporting Actress (Huffman) and Best Hair (Renée Chan).

References

External links
 
 

2019 films
2019 black comedy films
2010s English-language films
Canadian black comedy films
English-language Canadian films
Films about cancer
Films about television
Films not released in theaters due to the COVID-19 pandemic
Films shot in Hamilton, Ontario
Quiver Distribution films
2010s Canadian films